José María "Jomari" Garchitorena Yllana (born August 16, 1976) is a Filipino actor, model, racing driver, concert producer, promoter, and politician.

He rose to fame as one of the members of 1990s teen group "Gwapings" together with Mark Anthony Fernandez, Eric Fructuoso, and later with Jao Mapa.

Two of his films, Diliryo (Delirium) and Sa Pusod ng Dagat (The Heart of the Sea) were presented at the 1997 and 1998 Toronto International Film Festival respectively. Diliryo was released through MAQ Productions, directed by Peque Gallaga and Lore Reyes, and starred Giselle Toengi as Yllana's leading lady. Sa Pusod ng Dagat starred Marilou Diaz-Abaya, Elizabeth Oropesa, and Chin Chin Gutierrez.

Career
Yllana appeared in several TV shows for ABS-CBN and GMA networks. In 2009, Yllana starred in Zorro, and became a contestant in Celebrity Duets: Philippine Edition. Also, Yllana played Alex Dorantes in Rosalinda opposite with Carla Abellana and Geoff Eigenmann and starred in the movie Yaya and Angelina: The Spoiled Brat Movie with Michael V., Ogie Alcasid and ex-wife Aiko Melendez.

Currently, Yllana remains a freelance actor.

Other works
Aside from being an actor, Yllana also was a successful commercial and promotional model for the Bench clothing line.

Currently, Yllana together with controversial politician Ronald "Ronnie" Singson, heads the Fearless Productions, a joint business venture which produces and promotes concerts in the Philippines for international and local artists.

Politics
In the 2016, Yllana ran for councilor of 1st District of Parañaque and won. He was re-elected in 2019 and in 2022.

Personal life
Yllana has brothers in showbiz: comedian-actors Anjo (older brother) and Ryan (younger brother). Yllana is the ex-husband of actress/politician Aiko Melendez and they have a son named Andrei. He and Melendez remain good friends and maintain a good co-parenting relationship.

Yllana's ex-girlfriends include Priscilla Almeda, Ara Mina and Pops Fernandez. Yllana and Almeda reunited in 2019.

Filmography

Television

Movies
The Healing (2012) as Robert
Ikaw Ang Pag-ibig (2011) as Dr. Joey Lucas
Yaya and Angelina: The Spoiled Brat Movie (2009) as Mr. A
Enteng Kabisote 4: Okay Ka Fairy Ko...The Beginning of the Legend (2007) as Jose Rizal
Sigaw (2004) as Bert
Minsan Pa (2004) as Jerry
Gatas... Sa Dibdib Ng Kaaway (2001)
Katayan (2000)
Most Wanted (2000)
Mahal Kita, Walang Iwanan (2000) as Bodgie
Bulaklak ng Maynila (1999) as Ed
Warat: Bibigay Ka Ba? (1999) as Rex
Banatan (1999)
Sambahin Ang Ngalan Mo (1998) as Ramoncito
Sagad Sa Init (1998)
Sa Pusod ng Dagat (1998) as Pepito
Diliryo (1997)
Kahit Kailan (1997)
Mula Noon Hanggang Ngayon (1996) as Nico
Kabilin-bilinan Ng Lola (1996)
Taguan (1996) as Serge
Araw-Araw, Gabi-Gabi (1995)
Pare Ko (1995) as Mackie
The Secrets of Sarah Jane: Sana'y Mapatawad Mo (1994) as Francis
Sobra Talaga...Over (1994)
Gwapings Dos (1993) as Dennis
Dino... Abangan Ang Susunod Na... (1993)
Bulag, Pipi at Bingi (1993)
Secret Love (1993) as Jodi
Gwapings: The Adventure (1992) as Mike
Mahal Kita Walang Iba (1992) as Ruben
Shake, Rattle & Roll III: Ate (1991) as Delinquent
Emma Salazar Case (1991) as Leo
Hihintayin Kita Sa Langit (1991) as Young Gabriel
Regal Shocker The Movie: Aparador (1989)

Awards

References

External links

1976 births
Filipino male child actors
Bicolano people
Filipino racing drivers
Filipino male television actors
Participants in Philippine reality television series
Star Magic
Living people
Sportspeople from Manila
Male actors from Manila
Bicolano actors
Filipino male film actors
Filipino male comedians
Filipino people of Spanish descent
ABS-CBN personalities
GMA Network personalities
People from Parañaque
PDP–Laban politicians
Liberal Party (Philippines) politicians
Filipino actor-politicians